Cable Street is a street in London's East End, famous for the Battle of Cable Street, a riot in 1936.

Other Cable Streets

Cable Street can refer to streets :-
in these English towns (with postcode) : 
Bolton (BL1 2)
Braunton, Devon (EX33)
Connah's Quay, Flintshire (CH5)
Darlington (DL3)
Deeside (CH5 4)
Formby (L37 3)
Ilkeston, Erewash (DE7)
Knebworth (SG3)
Lancaster, England (LA1)
Liverpool (L1 8)
Manchester (M4 5)
Salford (M3 7)
Southampton (SO14 5)
Southport (PR9 0)
Stanton, Gloucestershire  (WR12)
Wolverhampton (WV2 2)

For the Cable Street Particulars, a fictional secret police force (whose office is in a fictional Cable Street) in Terry Pratchett's Discworld series, see Ankh-Morpork City Watch.